Hedensted railway station is a railway station serving the railway town of Hedensted in East Jutland, Denmark.

The station is located on the Fredericia-Aarhus railway line from Fredericia to Aarhus. It opened in 1868, closed in 1974, but reopened in 2006. It offers direct regional train services to Aarhus and Fredericia. The train services are operated by the national railway company DSB.

History 
Hedensted station was opened on 3 October 1868 with the opening of the Fredericia-Aarhus railway line from Fredericia to Aarhus. It was closed on 26 May 1974, but the station reopened on 8 January 2006.

Operations 
The train services are operated by the national railway company DSB. The station offers regional train services to Aarhus and Fredericia.

See also
 List of railway stations in Denmark

References

Citations

Bibliography

External links

 Banedanmark – government agency responsible for maintenance and traffic control of most of the Danish railway network
 DSB – largest Danish train operating company
 Danske Jernbaner – website with information on railway history in Denmark

Railway stations opened in 1868
Railway stations closed in 1974
Railway stations opened in 2006
Railway stations in the Central Denmark Region
1868 establishments in Denmark
2006 establishments in Denmark
Railway stations in Denmark opened in the 21st century